Olive Moorefield (born August 23, 1932) is an American actress and singer. She appeared in more than twenty films from 1954 to 1976.

Early years 
Moorefield is one of nine children. When she was 5 years old, she began studying music, and at 8 she was singing solos in church. At 16, she began studying opera with the help of a $4,000 scholarship from a radio station in Pittsburgh. Her early employment included babysitting, singing in night clubs, and stenography. After she graduated from Homestead High School, she attended Carnegie Institute of Technology and then transferred to the Pennsylvania College for Women.

Career 
On stage, Moorefield sang with the Pittsburgh Light Opera Company and portrayed Bess a 1965 production of Porgy and Bess in Vienna. She performed in that production and in Kiss Me Kate as leading lady of the Vienna Volksoper.

Moorefield's work in films included at least 15 German and Viennese motion pictures. She also recorded German hit songs and performed in an Italian-language production of Kiss Me Kate on Italian television.

After the closing of Moorefield's first Broadway musical, the U S Information Service (USIS) employed her to sing American folk songs and spirituals for American military personnel stationed in Austria. She used her free time there to study singing and to attend opera. She also performed in Carousel and Show Boat in a theater that the USIS opened in Vienna. In 1962, she became a TV star in Germany. Her work on European TV included starring in the drama Requiem for a Nun.

Personal life 
Moorefield married Kurt Macht, a doctor whom she met when he treated her for a throat problem in Vienna.

Selected filmography

References

External links 

1932 births
Living people
American film actresses
21st-century American women